Juan Bosco Maino Canales (died 1976?) was a photographer, political activist, and opponent of Augusto Pinochet's regime in Chile. He was a leader in the Movimiento de Acción Popular Unitaria (United Popular Action Movement). He was detained on May 26, 1976 by agents of Dirección de Inteligencia Nacional (DINA) agents and disappeared.

Early life
Juan Maino was an engineering graduate from Universidad Técnica del Estado (State Technical University) and a militant and dirigent of the Movimiento de Acción Popular Unitaria. He was working on his thesis in mechanical engineering with classmate Antonio Elizondo Ormachea.

Arrest
Two days before his arrest, on May 24, 1976, around 3 p.m., Andrés Rekas Urra, the brother of Elizabeth Rekas Urra who, in turn, was the wife of Elizondo, was arrested by DINA agents. He was driven to a secret detention and torture facility known as Villa Grimaldi. There, he was interrogated about the "activities" of his sister and brother-in-law as well as Juan. He was forced to identify his sister in a clandestine stake-out and on May 26, he was able to hear his sister screaming at Villa Grimaldi.

Maino was arrested by DINA agents on the night of May 26, 1976, at the Elizondo apartment, in Ñuñoa, Santiago, together with Elizabeth Rekas Urra. The latter was pregnant at the time and her husband, Antonio Elizondo, had been detained earlier that same day around 6:30 p.m. at the intersection of Alameda Avenue and Lord Cochrane Street, in downtown Santiago. Both are also still listed as disappeared.

According to witnesses, Maino and Rekas were detained by at least three agents in one car, who remained at Elizondo's house past 2.00 a.m. Days after his disappearance, Maino's mother presented a habeas corpus to the 8th Criminal Tribunal of Santiago. The court refused to investigate the case. In the Chilean criminal system, investigating, prosecuting, and judging were all then done by only one person, the criminal judge, according to Judge Juan Guzmán's autobiography, released in 2005.

Andrés Rekas Urra was released the same day, but no trace of Antonio Elizondo, Elizabeth Rekas and Juan Maino has been found since then.

Investigation
In 2005, Paul Schäfer, the former leader the enclave of Colonia Dignidad, Chile, was charged with involvement in his "disappearance" after two cars owned by Maino were found inside Colonia Dignidad.

See also
Highway One (film)
List of people who disappeared

References

External links
 Truth Commissions Digital Collection: Reports: Chile PART THREE, Chapter Two (A.2.c) 1974 through August 1977

1970s missing person cases
1976 deaths
Assassinated Chilean journalists
Chilean photographers
Enforced disappearances in Chile
Missing people
Missing person cases in Chile
People killed in Operation Condor
Year of birth missing